Get the Goat is a 2021 Brazilian comedy film directed by Vitor Brandt, written by Vitor Brandt and Denis Nielsen and starring Victor Allen, Evelyn Castro and Juliano Cazarré. The film is streaming on Netflix.

Plot 
A badass cop, Bruce from Guará, loses a goat named Celestine. A drug trafficker takes Celestine to São Paulo and Bruce follows him. Assisted by a desk duty, violence-fearing cop, Trindade, Bruce not only finds the goat but also uncovers an underground drug lord named White Glove.

Cast 
 Victor Allen
 Evelyn Castro
 Juliano Cazarré
 Falcão
 Edmilson Filho as Bruceuilis
 Soren Hellerup as Sergio Petrov
 Letícia Lima
 Renan Medeiros
 Matheus Nachtergaele as Trindade
 Eyrio Okura
 Leandro Ramos
 Jéssica Tamochunas
 Valéria Vitoriano

Release
The film was digitally released on March 18, 2021 by Netflix.

References

External links 
 
 

2021 films
2021 comedy films
Brazilian comedy films
2020s Portuguese-language films
Portuguese-language Netflix original films